The Chacoan naked-tailed armadillo (Cabassous chacoensis) is a species of South American armadillo.

They also have smaller ears than the other species, and their ears also have a distinctive fleshy expansion on the forward edge that other species lack.

As its name suggests, the Chacoan naked-tailed armadillo is found in the Gran Chaco region of western Paraguay and north-central Argentina. It may also be found in Bolivia, and possibly Brazil. Within this region, it is more likely to be found in semi-arid, rather than humid, habitats, typically inhabiting open thorn forest and scrub.

Little is known of its biology and behaviour, although it is known to be nocturnal, and an active burrower. They feed primarily on ants and termites. They have been reported to make a grunting call, and to give birth to a single young at a time.

References

Armadillos
Gran Chaco
Mammals of Argentina
Mammals of Uruguay
Myrmecophagous mammals
Near threatened animals
Near threatened biota of South America
Taxonomy articles created by Polbot
Mammals described in 1980